William James Carroll is a former New Zealand rower.

At the 1950 British Empire Games he won the gold medal as part of the men's coxed four.

References

Living people
New Zealand male rowers
Rowers at the 1950 British Empire Games
Commonwealth Games gold medallists for New Zealand
Commonwealth Games medallists in rowing
Year of birth missing (living people)
Medallists at the 1950 British Empire Games